Cnemolia onca is a species of beetle in the family Cerambycidae. It was described by Quedenfeldt in 1882.

References

Ancylonotini
Beetles described in 1882